The Roman Catholic Diocese of Qizhou/Kichow/Qichun  is a diocese located in Qizhou (in modern Hubei) in the Ecclesiastical province of Hankou in China.

History
 July 18, 1929: Established as Mission “sui iuris” of Huangzhou 黃州 from the Apostolic Vicariate of Hankou 漢口
 June 1, 1932: Promoted as Apostolic Prefecture of Huangzhou 黃州
 January 27, 1936: Promoted as Apostolic Vicariate of Qizhou 蘄州
 April 11, 1946: Promoted as Diocese of Qizhou 蘄州

Leadership
 Bishops of Qizhou 蘄州 (Roman rite)
 Bishop Horace Ferruccio Ceól, O.F.M. (June 10, 1948 – June 23, 1990)
 Vicars Apostolic of Qizhou 蘄州 (Roman Rite)
 Bishop Ruggero Raffaele Cazzanelli, O.F.M. (January 27, 1936 – 1941)

References

 GCatholic.org
 Catholic Hierarchy

Roman Catholic dioceses in China
Christian organizations established in 1929
Roman Catholic dioceses and prelatures established in the 20th century
Religion in Hubei